SWITCH is a Swiss foundation managing the .ch and .li country-code top-level domains for Switzerland and Liechtenstein, respectively. As the Swiss national research and education network organisation, SWITCH also manages the educational networks among Swiss universities and research facilities, and the links to other (non Swiss) university networks.

References

External links 
SWITCH.ch homepage
switch network

Internet in Switzerland
Liechtenstein–Switzerland relations
National research and education networks
Telecommunications in Switzerland
Telecommunications in Liechtenstein
Information technology organisations based in Switzerland